Stone Cold is a 1991 action film directed by Craig R. Baxley that centers on a biker gang that tries to assassinate the district attorney and free one of their members who is on trial for murder.  The film marked the acting debut of 1980s football star Brian Bosworth.

The film bombed financially at the box office, grossing $9 million on its $25 million budget.

Plot
Joe Huff is a tough Alabama cop who is frustrated with a system that handles criminals with kid gloves. Currently, Joe is suspended for displaying excessive violence toward criminals. After stopping a supermarket robbery, Joe is summoned by FBI Agent Cunningham who proceeds to blackmail him into going undercover, by threatening to turn Joe's three-week suspension into six months without pay.

Due to his proficiency in criminal biker arrests, Cunningham wants Joe to go undercover in Mississippi and infiltrate "The Brotherhood," a white supremacist biker gang linked to the murders of government officials and suspected of dealing drugs to the mafia. The Brotherhood is led by the rough and violent Chains Cooper.

Joe goes undercover as "John Stone", but his job is not easy. His FBI contact, Lance, is a germophobe who does not exactly fit in with the biker crowd, and the members of the Brotherhood, especially Chains, have their suspicions about "John Stone", who has seemingly come out of nowhere to get a piece of their action.

Tasked with killing a man as his initiation, Joe enlists the FBI's help to carefully fake the murder and is accepted into the Brotherhood. However, Chains's right-hand man Ice Hensley, does not trust Joe and eventually tries to expose him, leading to Ice's death in a high-speed motorcycle chase.

During the operation, Joe learns that the Brotherhood's ultimate goal is to eliminate Brent "The Whip" Whipperton, a District Attorney running for Governor of Mississippi, who has promised to crack down on crime within the state. They plan to use a cache of stolen military weapons to storm the Supreme Court, meeting at the Mississippi State Capitol, where one of their own is on trial for murder, and assassinate both Whipperton and the judges presiding over the case.

When Chains's girlfriend Nancy accidentally learns about Joe's identity, he confides in her, and offers her immunity if she cooperates with the FBI. Though resistant at first, Nancy accepts his offer, but the operation fails when the man Joe had supposedly killed to gain admission to the Brotherhood suddenly returns. In retaliation, Chains shoots and kills Nancy, but plans to do away with Joe in a more spectacular fashion, by strapping a bomb to his chest and throwing him from a helicopter en route to the Capitol.

Joe manages to fight his way free and commandeer the chopper, then takes the fight inside the Capitol, where a melee erupts between the Brotherhood and the local police. Chains uses an automatic rifle that was planted inside the courtroom to kill a government agent, two security guards, and all of the Supreme Court judges before taunting Whipperton and killing him as well. As Chains rallies his biker brethren, Joe battles his way through the ranks of the gang until finally coming face-to-face with Chains.

Joe easily wins the fight and leaves the gang leader in police custody before surrendering his firearm to Cunningham. Chains suddenly breaks free and steals an officer's gun, intending to shoot Joe. A gunshot is heard, and Chains abruptly falls to the ground, having been shot by Joe's partner Lance. Joe then marches stoically from the Capitol.

Cast

 Brian Bosworth as Detective Joe Huff / John Stone
 Lance Henriksen as "Chains" Cooper
 William Forsythe as "Ice" Hensley
 Arabella Holzbog as Nancy
 Sam McMurray as FBI Agent Lance
 Richard Gant as FBI Agent Cunningham
 David Tress as District Attorney Brent "The Whip" Whipperton
 Illana Diamant as Officer Sharon

Production
Original cut was rated NC-17 because of the violence, it was cut down for R rating. An uncut version was never released and no information about what was cut is known.

In a 2014 Q&A with an audience after a special 35mm screening of the film in Austin's Alamo Drafthouse, Brian Bosworth talked about how the original director of the movie was fired due to some "personal issues that he couldn't control which poured out on set", and his firing caused all the original backstory for Bosworth's character to be removed and changed after Craig R. Baxley was hired to direct. About 4 weeks of filming were therefore spent on scenes with Bosworth's character and his family (wife, child, and sister), which in the end were completely removed, with $4 million being spent on production expenses.

Filming was done on location along the Mississippi Gulf Coast and in and around Mobile, Alabama. The climactic scene was scheduled to be filmed at the Mississippi State Capitol in Jackson. The location was changed to the Arkansas State Capitol in Little Rock, although it was still identified as Mississippi's Capitol. The change was made when the MS State Capitol Commission refused to allow producers to remove several trees on the Capitol grounds for filming.

Reception
The film garnered poor reviews from critics. Rotten Tomatoes reports a positive score of 33% based on 9 reviews, with an average rating of 5/10. Audiences surveyed by CinemaScore gave the film a grade of "B+" on scale of A+ to F. Brian Bosworth's performance in the film earned him a Razzie Award nomination for Worst New Star.

The film was a box office flop, drawing $2.8 million in its first week. It eventually made $9 million domestically.

References

External links 
 
 
 
 

1991 films
1991 action thriller films
1990s gang films
Columbia Pictures films
Films shot in Mississippi
Films shot in Mobile, Alabama
Films shot in Kansas
Films shot in Arkansas
Films directed by Craig R. Baxley
Films scored by Sylvester Levay
Outlaw biker films
American exploitation films
1990s English-language films
1990s American films